A Eurogame, also called a German-style board game, German game, or Euro-style game, (generally just referred to as board games in Europe) is a class of tabletop games that generally has indirect player interaction and abstract physical components. Eurogames are sometimes contrasted with American-style board games, which generally involve more luck, conflict, and drama. They are usually less abstract than chess or Go, but more abstract than wargames. Likewise, they generally require more thought and planning than party games such as Pictionary or Trivial Pursuit.

History 

Contemporary Eurogames, such as Acquire, appeared in the 1960s. The 3M series of which Acquire formed a part became popular in Germany, and became a template for a new form of game, one in which direct conflict or warfare did not play a role, due in part to aversion in postwar Germany to products which glorified conflict.

German family board games 
The genre developed as a more concentrated design movement in the late 1970s and early 1980s in Germany. The genre has spread to other European countries such as France, the Netherlands, and Sweden. The Settlers of Catan, first published in 1995, paved the way for the genre outside Europe.
Though neither the first Eurogame nor the first such game to find an audience outside Germany, it became much more popular than any of its predecessors. It quickly sold millions of copies in Germany, and in the process brought money and attention to the genre as a whole.

21st century 
Germany purchased more board games per capita than any other country . While many Eurogames are published and played in Anglophone markets such as the United States and the United Kingdom, they occupy a niche status there. Other games in the genre to achieve widespread popularity include Carcassonne, Puerto Rico, Ticket to Ride, and Alhambra.

Characteristics 

Eurogames tend to be focused on challenge for players. They feature economics and the acquisition of resources rather than direct conflict, and have a limited amount of luck. They also differ from abstract strategy games like chess by using themes tied to specific locales, and emphasize individual development and comparative achievement rather than direct conflict. Eurogames also emphasize the mechanical challenges of their systems over having the systems match the theme of the game. They are generally simpler than the wargames that flourished in the 1970s and 1980s from publishers such as SPI and Avalon Hill, but nonetheless often have a considerable depth of play.

One consequence of the increasing popularity of this genre has been an expansion upwards in complexity. Games such as Puerto Rico that were considered quite complex when Eurogames proliferated in the U.S. after the turn of the millennium are now the norm, with newer high-end titles like Terra Mystica and Tzolkin being significantly more difficult to master.

Incentive for social play 

While many titles (especially the strategically heavier ones) are enthusiastically played by gamers as a hobby, Eurogames are, for the most part, well-suited to social play. In keeping with this social function, various characteristics of the games tend to support that aspect well, and these have become quite common across the genre. In contrast to games such as Risk or Monopoly, in which a close game can extend indefinitely, Eurogames usually have a mechanism to stop the game within its stated playing time. Common mechanisms include a pre-determined winning score, a set number of game turns, or depletion of limited game resources.  Playing time varies from a half-hour to a few hours, with one to two hours being typical. Generally Eurogames do not have a fixed number of players like chess or bridge; although there is a sizeable body of German-style games that are designed for exactly two players, most games can accommodate anywhere from two to six players (with varying degrees of suitability). Six-player games are somewhat rare, with Power Grid and Caverna (the latter supporting seven player games) being two examples, or require expansions, as with The Settlers of Catan or Carcassonne. Players usually play for themselves individually, rather than in a partnership or team.

A growing number of Eurogames support solo play with modified rulesets. To win, the player either has to achieve specific single-player campaign goals or beat the score of a simulated opponent that takes actions according to special rules outlined in the scenario. Recent Eurogames suitable for solo play include Wingspan, Terraforming Mars or Spirit Island.

No player elimination 
Another prominent characteristic of these games is the lack of player elimination.  Eliminating players before the end of the game is seen as contrary to the social aspect of such games.  Most of these games are designed to keep all players in the game as long as possible, so it is rare to be certain of victory or defeat until relatively late in the game. Related to no-player-elimination, Eurogame scoring systems are often designed so that hidden scoring or end-of-game bonuses can catapult a player who appears to be in a lagging position at end of play into the lead. A second-order consequence is that Eurogames tend to have multiple paths to victory (dependent on aiming at different end-of-game bonuses) and it is often not obvious to other players which strategic path a player is pursuing. Balancing mechanisms are often integrated into the rules, giving slight advantages to lagging players and slight hindrances to the leaders. This helps to keep the game competitive to the very end, an example of which is Power Grid, where the turn order is determined by number of cities (and biggest power plant as the tie-breaker), such that players further ahead are handicapped in their option of plays.

Game mechanics 
A wide variety of often innovative mechanisms or mechanics are used, and familiar mechanics such as rolling dice and moving, capture, or trick taking are avoided. If a game has a board, the board is usually irregular rather than uniform or symmetric (such as Risk rather than chess or Scrabble). The board is often random (as in The Settlers of Catan) or has random elements (such as Tikal). Some boards are merely mnemonic or organizational and contribute only to ease of play, such as a cribbage board; examples of this include Puerto Rico and Princes of Florence. Random elements are often present, but do not usually dominate the game. While rules are light to moderate, they allow depth of play, usually requiring thought, planning, and a shift of tactics through the game and often with a chess- or backgammon-like opening game, middle game, and end game.

Stewart Woods' Eurogames cites six examples of mechanics common to eurogames:

Tile Placement – spatial placement of game components on the playing board.
Auctions – includes open and hidden auctions of both resources and actions from other players and the game system itself.
Trading/Negotiation – not simply trading resources of equivalent values, but allowing players to set markets.
Set Collection – collecting resources in specific groups that are then cashed in for points or other currency.
Area Control – also known as area majority or influence, this involves controlling a game element or board space through allocation of resources.
Worker Placement or Role Selection – players choose specific game actions in sequential order, with players disallowed from choosing a previously selected action.

Low randomness 

Eurogame designs tend to de-emphasize luck and random elements. Often, the only random element of the game will be resource or terrain distribution in the initial setup, or (less frequently) the random order of a set of event or objective cards. The role played by deliberately random mechanics in other styles of game is instead fulfilled by the unpredictability of the behavior of other players.

Themes 
Examples of themes are:
 Carcassonne – build a medieval landscape complete with walled cities, monasteries, roads, and fields.
 Puerto Rico – develop plantations on the island of Puerto Rico, set in the 18th century.
 Power Grid – expand a power company's network and buy better plants.
 Imperial – as an international investor, influence the politics of pre-World War I European empires.
 Bruxelles 1893 – take the role of an Art Nouveau architect during the late 19th century and try to become the most famous architect in Belgium.

Game designer as author 
Although not relevant to actual play, the name of the game's designer is often prominently mentioned on the box, or at least in the rule book. Top designers enjoy considerable following among enthusiasts of Eurogames. For this reason, the name "designer games" is often offered as a description of the genre. Recently, there has also been a wave of games designed as spin-offs of popular novels, such as the games taking their style from the German bestsellers Der Schwarm and Tintenherz.

Industry

Designers 

Designers of Eurogames include:
 Antoine Bauza, a prolific French designer, creator of 7 Wonders, Tokaido, and Takenoko.
Bruno Cathala, a French-born game designer, creator of Kingdomino and Five Tribes.
 Vlaada Chvátil, a Czech designer of board games and video games, whose games include Through the Ages: A Story of Civilization, Galaxy Trucker, Space Alert, and Codenames.  His rule books are often divided into several "learning scenarios" that gradually introduce players to the rules as they progress through the scenarios.
 Leo Colovini, designer of Cartagena and Carcassonne: The Discovery.
 Rüdiger Dorn, a German designer who created Istanbul, Karuba, Las Vegas, Luxor, and others.
Bruno Faidutti, French designer of Citadels.
 Stefan Feld, designer particularly of games that make use of dice, and that allow players to score points in a variety of ways. He has designed games such as Castles of Burgundy and Trajan, and three of his games (Strasbourg, Bruges, and Carpe Diem) have been nominated for the Kennerspiel des Jahres.
 Friedemann Friese, a German designer, creator of Power Grid, as well as many others.
 Mac Gerdts, a German designer of games such as Antike, Imperial, Navegador, and Concordia.
 Reiner Knizia, one of the most prolific German game designers, having designed over 600 published games. Recurring mechanisms in his games include auctions (Ra and Modern Art), tile placement (Tigris and Euphrates and Ingenious), and intricate scoring rules (Samurai). He has also designed many card games such as Lost Cities, Schotten-Totten, and Blue Moon, and the cooperative board game The Lord of the Rings.
 Wolfgang Kramer, who often works with other game designers. His titles include El Grande, Tikal, Princes of Florence, and Torres. His games often have some sort of action point system, and include some geometric element.
 Alan R. Moon, a British-born designer with numerous games to his credit, often with a railway theme, including the Spiel des Jahres-winning Ticket to Ride and Elfenland.
 Alex Randolph, who created over 125 games and is responsible for the placement of the author's name on the rules and box.
 Uwe Rosenberg, designer of games such as Agricola, Le Havre, Patchwork, and several others.
 Sid Sackson was a prolific American game designer whose games, particularly Acquire, prefigured and strongly influenced the Eurogame genre.
 Michael Schacht, German designer of Coloretto, Zooloretto, Aquaretto, Valdora, Africana, Web of power, China, Han, Hansa, Mondo, Mondo Sapiens, Spirits of the Forest, Coney Island.
 Andreas Seyfarth, who has designed the games Puerto Rico, Manhattan, and, with Karen Seyfarth, Thurn and Taxis.
 Klaus Teuber, designer of Catan, which has sold more than 22 million copies.
 Klaus-Jürgen Wrede, the German game designer of the Carcassonne board game series. , Carcassonne has 10 major expansions as well as numerous mini-expansions.

Events 

The Internationale Spieltage, also known as Essen Spiel, or the Essen Games Fair, is the largest non-digital game convention in the world, and the place where the largest number of eurogames are released each year. Founded in 1983 and held each fall in Essen, Germany, the fair was founded with the objective of providing a venue for people to meet and play board games, and show gaming as an integral part of German culture.

A "World Boardgaming Championships" is held annually in July in Pennsylvania, USA.  The event is nine days long and includes tournament tracks of over a hundred games; while traditional wargames are played there, all of the most popular tournaments are Eurogames and it is generally perceived as a Eurogame-centered event.  Attendance is international, though players from the U.S. and Canada predominate.

Awards 
The most prestigious German board game award is the Spiel des Jahres ("game of the year"). The award is very family-oriented. Shorter, more approachable, games such as Ticket to Ride and Elfenland are usually preferred by the committee that gives out the award.

In 2011, the jury responsible for the Spiel des Jahres created the Kennerspiel des Jahres, or connoisseur's game of the year, for more complex games.

The Deutscher Spiele Preis ("German game prize") is also awarded to games that are more complex and strategic, such as Puerto Rico. However, there are a few games with broad enough appeal to win both awards: The Settlers of Catan (1995), Carcassonne (2001), Dominion (2009).

Influence 
Xbox Live Arcade has included popular games from the genre, with Catan being released to strong sales on May 13, 2007, Carcassonne being released on June 27, 2007. Lost Cities and Ticket to Ride soon followed. Alhambra was due to follow later in 2007 until being cancelled.

The iPhone received versions of The Settlers of Catan and Zooloretto in 2009. Carcassonne was added to the iPhone App Store in June 2010. Later, Ticket to Ride was developed for both the iPhone and the iPad, significantly boosting sales of the board game.

See also 
 BoardGameGeek – online forum for board gaming hobbyists
 BrettspielWelt – free German online gaming site
 Cooperative board game – board games in which players work together to achieve a common goal
 Going Cardboard – documentary about German-style board games and their community
 List of game designers

References

External links 
 Brett and Board  with information on German-style games (has not been updated in some time)
 Luding.org – board game database with over 15,000 English and German reviewed games
 BoardGameGeek – internet database of over 100,000 tabletop games, with online fan community.
 Gamerate.net – internet database of board, card and electronic games.

Board games
German culture